Sirona (minor planet designation: 116 Sirona) is a somewhat large and bright-colored main-belt asteroid that was discovered by the German-American astronomer C. H. F. Peters on September 8, 1871, and named after Sirona, the Celtic goddess of healing.

This body is orbiting the Sun with a period of 4.60 years and an eccentricity (ovalness) of 0.14. The orbital plane is inclined by 3.56° to the plane of the ecliptic. The cross-section diameter of this object is ~72 km. Photometric observations of this asteroid gave a light curve with a period of 12.028 hours and a brightness variation of 0.42 in magnitude. It has the spectrum of an S-type asteroid, suggesting a siliceous composition.

References

External links 
 
 

000116
Discoveries by Christian Peters
Named minor planets
000116
000116
18710908